Santa Marta is a corregimiento in Bugaba District, Chiriquí Province, Panama. Its population as of 1990 was 2,940; its population as of 2000 was 3,396.

Notable people
Ricardo Cordoba, former World Boxing Champion.

References

Corregimientos of Chiriquí Province